Harry James Mott III (born May 5, 1929) is a retired brigadier general in the United States Army. He is a former acting chief of the United States Army Reserve, a position he held from August 1, 1986 to November 30, 1986. Mott also was Deputy Chief of the Army Reserve from March 13, 1983 to July 31, 1986, and from December 1, 1986 to August 5, 1987.

Mott was born in Newark, New Jersey and raised in northern New Jersey and New York City. He joined the Naval Reserve in February 1947 and was appointed to the United States Naval Academy in June 1949. Mott left the Naval Academy in his second year after failing calculus and enlisted in the Army Reserve in June 1951. He graduated from Officer Candidate School at Fort Benning, Georgia in May 1952 and was commissioned as a second lieutenant of Infantry. Mott was deployed to Korea from March through December 1953. After returning to the United States, he completed a B.A. degree in economics at Adelphi University in 1956.

References

1929 births
Living people
Military personnel from Newark, New Jersey
United States Army personnel of the Korean War
Adelphi University alumni
Recipients of the Meritorious Service Medal (United States)
United States Army generals
Recipients of the Distinguished Service Medal (US Army)